Adesmus nevisi is a species of beetle in the family Cerambycidae. It was described by Gounelle in 1909. It is known from Brazil and Bolivia.

References

Adesmus
Beetles described in 1909